Indian Institute of Technology Kanpur (IIT Kanpur) is a public institute of technology located in Kanpur, Uttar Pradesh, India. It was declared to be an Institute of National Importance by the Government of India under the Institutes of Technology Act.

The institution was established in 1959. As one of the first Indian Institutes of Technology, the institute was created with the assistance of a consortium of nine US research universities as part of the Kanpur Indo-American Programme (KIAP).

History

IIT Kanpur was established by an Act of Parliament in 1960 by the Government of India. The institute was started in December 1959 in a room in the canteen building of the Harcourt Butler Technological Institute at Agricultural Gardens in Kanpur. In 1963, the institute moved to its present location, on the Grand Trunk Road near Kalyanpur locality in Kanpur district. The campus was designed by Achyut Kavinde in a modernist style.

During the first ten years of its existence, a consortium of nine US universities (namely MIT, UCB, California Institute of Technology, Princeton University, Carnegie Institute of Technology, University of Michigan, Ohio State University,
Case Institute of Technology and Purdue University) helped set up IIT Kanpur's research laboratories and academic programmes under the Kanpur Indo-American Programme (KIAP). The first director of the institute was P. K. Kelkar (after whom the Central Library was renamed in 2002).

Under the guidance of economist John Kenneth Galbraith, IIT Kanpur was the first institute in India to offer Computer science education. The earliest computer course was started at the institute in August 1963 on an IBM 1620 system. The initiative for computer education came from the Electrical engineering department, then under the chairmanship of Prof. H.K. Kesavan, who was concurrently the chairman of Electrical Engineering and head of the Computer Centre. Prof. Harry Huskey of the University of California, Berkeley, who preceded Kesavan, helped with the computer activity at IIT-Kanpur. In 1971, the institute began an independent academic program in Computer Science and Engineering, leading to MTech and PhD degrees.

In 1972 the KIAP program ended, in part because of political tensions between India and Pakistan (as the USA supported Pakistan). Government funding was also reduced as a reaction to the sentiment that the IIT's were contributing to the brain drain.

The institute's annual technical festival, Techkriti, was first started in 1995.

Campus
 
This land was donated by the Government of Uttar Pradesh in 1960 and by March 1963 the institute had moved to its current location.

The institute has around 6478 students with 3938 undergraduate students and 2540 postgraduate students and about 500 research associates.

Noida Extension centre
IIT Kanpur is to open an extension centre in Noida with the plan of making a small convention centre there for supporting outreach activities. Its foundation was laid on 4 December 2012 on 5 acres of land allocated by Uttar Pradesh state government in the sector-62 of Noida city, which is less than an hour's journey from New Delhi and the Indira Gandhi International Airport. The cost of construction is estimated to be about 25 crores. The new campus will have an auditorium, seminar halls for organising national and international conferences and an International Relations Office along with a 7-storey guest house. Several short-term management courses and refresher courses meant for distance learning will be available at the extension center.News from. IITK. Retrieved 9 October 2013.

Helicopter service
Being a major industrial town, Kanpur has a good connectivity by rail and by road but it lags behind in terms of air connectivity. IIT Kanpur was suffering significantly in comparison to IIT Delhi and IIT Bombay due to this reason as far as visiting companies and other dignitaries are concerned
On 1 June 2013, a helicopter ferry service was started at IIT Kanpur run by Pawan Hans Helicopters Limited. In its initial run the service connects IIT Kanpur to Lucknow, but it is planned to later extend it to New Delhi. Currently  there are two flights daily to and from Lucknow Airport with a duration of 25 minutes. Lucknow Airport operates both international and domestic flights to major cities. IIT Kanpur is the first academic institution in the country to provide such a service. The estimated charges are Rs. 6000 (US$100) per person. If anyone would like to avail the facility he/she have to contact Student Placement Office (SPO) at IIT Kanpur, since the helicopter service is subject to availability of chopper rights. The campus also has airstrips which allows flight workshops and joyrides for students.

New York Office
The institute has set up an office in New York with alumnus, Sanjiv Khosla designated as the overseas brand ambassador of the institute. It is located on 62, William Street, Manhattan. The office aims to hunt for qualified and capable faculty abroad, facilitate internship opportunities in North American universities and be conduit for research tie ups with various US universities. The New York Office also tries to amass funds through the alumni based there. A system that invites students and faculty of foreign institutes to IIT Kanpur is also being formulated.

Organisation and administration

Governance

All IITs follow the same organization structure which has President of India as visitor at the top of the hierarchy. Directly under the president is the IIT Council. Under the IIT Council is the board of governors of each IIT. Under the board of governors is the director, who is the chief academic and executive officer of the IIT. Under the director, in the organizational structure, comes the deputy director. Under the director and the deputy director, come the deans, the heads of various departments, and the registrar.

Departments
The academic departments at IIT Kanpur are:

Academics

Undergraduate
IIT Kanpur offers four-year BTech programs in Aerospace Engineering, Biological Sciences and Bio-engineering, Chemical Engineering, Civil Engineering, Computer Science and Engineering, Electrical Engineering, Materials Science and Engineering and Mechanical Engineering. The admission to these programs is procured through Joint Entrance Examination. IITK offers admission only to bachelor's degree now (discontinuing the integrated course programs), but it can be extended by 1 year to make it integrated, depending on the choice of student and based on his/her performance there at undergraduate level. IIT Kanpur also offers four-year B.S. Programs in Pure and Applied Sciences (Mathematics, Physics and Chemistry in particular), Earth Science and Economics.

New academic system
From 2011, IIT Kanpur has started offering a four-year BS program in sciences and has kept its BTech Program intact. Entry to the five-year MTech/MBA programs and Dual degree programme will be done based on the CPI of students instead of JEE rank. In order to reduce the number of student exams, IIT Kanpur has also abolished the earlier system of conducting two mid-term examinations. Instead, only two examinations (plus two quizzes in most courses depending on the instructor-in-charge, one before mid-semesters and the other after the mid-semesters and before the end-semesters examination), one between the semester and other towards the end of it would be held from the academic session starting July 2011 onward as per Academic Review Committee's recommendations.

Postgraduate
Postgraduate courses in Engineering offer Master of Technology (MTech), MS (R) and PhD(Doctor of Philosophy) degrees. The institute also offers two-tier MSc(Master of Science) courses in areas of basic sciences in which students are admitted through Joint Admission Test for MSc (JAM) exam. The institute also offers M.Des. (2 years), M.B.A. (2 years) and MSc (2 years) degrees. Admissions to MTech is made once a year through Graduate Aptitude Test in Engineering. Admissions to M. Des are made once a year through both Graduate Aptitude Test in Engineering (GATE) and Common Entrance Exam for Design (CEED). Until 2011, admissions to the M.B.A. program were accomplished through the Joint Management Entrance Test (JMET), held yearly, and followed by a Group Discussion/Personal Interview process. In 2011, JMET was replaced by Common Admission Test (CAT).

Admissions
Undergraduate admissions until 2012 were being done through the national-level Indian Institute of Technology Joint Entrance Examination (IIT-JEE). Following the Ministry of Human Resource Development's decision to replace IIT-JEE with a common engineering entrance examination, IIT Kanpur's admissions are now based on JEE (Joint Entrance Examination) -Advanced level along with other IITs.

Postgraduate admissions are made through the Graduate Aptitude Test in Engineering and Common Admission Test.

Rankings

Internationally, IIT Kanpur was ranked 264 in QS World University Rankings for 2023 and 66 Asia.

In India, IIT Kanpur was ranked third among engineering colleges by India Today in 2021. It was ranked fourth among engineering colleges in India by the National Institutional Ranking Framework (NIRF) in 2020, and sixth overall. Outlook India ranked it fifth among government engineering colleges in 2022.

The Department of Industrial and Management Engineering was ranked 16 among management schools in India by NIRF in 2020.

Laboratories and other facilities

Facilities include the National Wind Tunnel Facility. Other large research centres include the Advanced Centre for Material Science, a Bio-technology centre, the Advanced Centre for Electronic Systems, and the Samtel Centre for Display Technology, Centre for Mechatronics, Centre for Laser Technology, Prabhu Goel Research Centre for Computer and Internet Security, Facility for Ecological and Analytical Testing. The departments have their own libraries.

The institute has its own airfield, for flight testing and gliding.

PK Kelkar Library (formerly Central Library) is an academic library of the institute with a collection of more than 300,000 volumes, and subscriptions to more than 1,000 periodicals. The library was renamed to its present name in 2003 after Dr. P K Kelkar, the first director of the institute. It is housed in a three-story building, with a total floor area of 6973 square metres.  The Abstracting and Indexing periodicals, Microform and CD-ROM databases, technical reports, Standards and thesis are in the library. Each year, about 4,500 books and journal volumes are added to the library.

The New Core Labs (NCL) is 3-storey building with state of the art physics and chemistry laboratories for courses in the first year. The New Core Labs also has Linux and Windows computer labs for the use of first year courses and a Mathematics department laboratory housing machines with high computing power.

IIT Kanpur has set up the Startup Innovation and Incubation Centre (SIIC) (previously known as "SIDBI" Innovation and Incubation Centre) in collaboration with the Small Industries development Bank of India (SIDBI) aiming to aid innovation, research, and entrepreneurial activities in technology-based areas. SIIC helps business Start-ups to develop their ideas into commercially viable products.

A team of students, working under the guidance of faculty members of the institute and scientists of Indian Space Research Organisation (ISRO) have designed and built India's first nano satellite Jugnu, which was successfully launched in orbit on 12 Oct 2011 by ISRO's PSLV-C18.

Computer Centre
The Computer Centre is one of the advanced computing service centre among academic institution in India. IT hosts IIT Kanpur website and provides personal web space for students and faculties.  It also provides a spam filtered email server and high speed fibre optic Internet to all the hostels and the academics. Users have multiple options to choose among various interfaces to access mail service.  It has Linux and windows laboratories equipped with dozens of high-end software like MATLAB, Autocad, Ansys, Abaqus etc. for use of students. Apart from departmental computer labs, computer centre hosts more than 300 Linux terminals and more than 100 Windows terminals and is continuously available to the students for academic work and recreation. Computer centre has recently adopted an open source software policy for its infrastructure and computing. Various high-end compute and GPU servers are remotely available from data centre for user computation.

Computer centre has multiple super computing clusters for research and teaching activity. In June 2014 IIT Kanpur launched their second supercomputer which is India's fifth most powerful supercomputer as of now. The new supercomputer 'Cluster Platform SL230s Gen8' manufactured by Hewlett-Packard has 15,360 cores and a theoretical peak (Rpeak) 307.2 TFlop/s and is the world's 192th most powerful supercomputer as of June 2015. Recently, IIT Kanpur has developed a compressed air-based mineral transport system. The project was presented at the Global Investors Summit, in 2023. It received good feedback for its less material loss, reduced air pollution, and efficiency to reduce travel time to a great extent. The main objective of the system is to transport coal and slurry.

Students' research related activity
Research is controlled by the Office of the Dean of Research and Development. Under the aegis of the Office the students publish the quarterly NERD Magazine (Notes on Engineering Research and Development) which publishes scientific and technical content created by students. Articles may be original work done by students in the form of hobby projects, term projects, internships, or theses. Articles of general interest which are informative but do not reflect original work are also accepted. The institute is part of the European Research and Education Collaboration with Asia (EURECA) programme since 2008.

Along with the magazine a student research organisation, PoWER (Promotion of Work Experience and Research) has been started. Under it several independent student groups are working on projects like the Lunar Rover for ISRO, alternate energy solutions under the Group for Environment and Energy Engineering, ICT solutions through a group Young Engineers, solution for diabetes, green community solutions through ideas like zero water and zero waste quality air approach. Through BRaIN (Biological Research and Innovation Network) students interested in solving biological problems get involved in research projects like genetically modifying fruit flies to study molecular systems and developing bio-sensors to detect alcohol levels. A budget of Rs 1.5 to 2 crore has been envisaged to support student projects that demonstrate technology.

Defence
Assisting the Indian Ordnance Factories in not only upgrading existing products, but also developing new weapon platforms.

Jugnu

The students of IIT Kanpur made a nano satellite called Jugnu, which was given by president Pratibha Patil to ISRO for launch. Jugnu is a remote sensing satellite which will be operated by the Indian Institute of Technology Kanpur. It is a nanosatellite which will be used to provide data for agriculture and disaster monitoring. It is a 3-kilogram (6.6 lb) spacecraft, which measures 34 centimetres (13 in) in length by 10 centimetres (3.9 in) in height and width. Its development programme cost around 25 million rupees. It has a design life of one year.
Jugnu's primary instrument is the Micro Imaging System, a near infrared camera which will be used to observe vegetation. It also carries a GPS receiver to aid tracking, and is intended to demonstrate a microelectromechanical inertial measurement unit.

IITK Motorsports
IITK motorsports is the biggest and most comprehensive student initiative of the college, founded in January 2011. It is a group of students from varied disciplines who aim at designing and fabricating a Formula-style race car for international Formula SAE
(Society of Automotive Engineers) events. Most of the components of the car, except the engine, tyres and wheel rims, are designed and manufactured by the team members themselves. The car is designed to provide maximum performance under the constraints of the event, while ensuring the driveability, reliability, driver safety and aesthetics of the car are not compromised.

Maraal UAVs
Researchers at IIT Kanpur have developed a series of solar powered UAVs named MARAAL-1 & MARAAL-2. Development of Maraal is notable as it is the first solar powered UAV developed in India. Maraal-2 is fully indigenous.

Student life

National events

Antaragni: Antaragni is a non-profit organisation run by the students of IIT Kanpur. It was funded entirely by the Student Gymkhana of the university it began.  Today  the budget is almost Rs 1 crore, raised through sponsorship. It began as an inter-collegiate cultural event in 1964, and now draws in over 1,00,000 visitors from 300 colleges in India Annual cultural festival held over 4 days in October. The festival includes music, drama, literary games, fashion show and quizzing. There is a YouTube channel dedicated to the festival with 1,000+ subscribers.
Techkriti: It was started in 1995 with an aim to encourage interest and innovation in technology among students and to provide a platform for industry and academia to interact. Megabucks (a business and entrepreneurship festival) used to be held independently but was merged with Techkriti in 2010. Notable speakers at Techkriti have included APJ Abdul Kalam, Vladimir Voevodsky, Douglas Osheroff, Oliver Smithies, Rakesh Sharma, David Griffiths and Richard Stallman. 
 Udghosh: Udghosh is IIT Kanpur's annual sports festival Usually held in September.It started in 2004 as inter- college sports meet organised by the institute. UDGHOSH involves students from all over India competing in the university's sports facilities. The festival includes Motivational Talks, Mini Marathon, Gymnastic Shows and Sport Quizzes to various sports events.
 Vivekananda Youth Leadership Convention: Vivekananda Samiti, under Students Gymkhana, on behalf of the IIT Kanpur, has undertaken the celebration of 150th Birth Anniversary of Swami Vivekananda from 2011 to 2015. The convention has included Kiran Bedi, Bana Singh, Yogendra Singh Yadav, Raju Narayana Swamy, Arunima Sinha, Rajendra Singh and other personalities from different fields in previous years.
 E-summit: It started in 2013. The first E-Summit was scheduled for 16–18 Aug 2013. These three-day festival by Entrepreneurship Cell, IIT Kanpur on the theme Emerge on the Radar included talks by eminent personalities, workshops and competitions.

Students' Gymkhana

The Students' Gymkhana is the students' government organization of IIT Kanpur, established in 1962.

The Students' Gymkhana functions mainly through the Students' Senate, an elected student representative body composed of senators elected from each batch and the six elected executives:
 President, Students' Gymkhana.
 General Secretary, Media and Culture.
 General Secretary, Games and Sports.
 General Secretary, Science and Technology.
 General Secretary (UG), Academics and Career
 General Secretary (PG), Academics and Career

The number of senators in the Students' Senate is around 50–55. A senator is elected for every 150 students of IIT Kanpur.

The meetings of the Students' Senate are chaired by the chairperson, Students' Senate, who is elected by the Senate.
The Senate lays down the guidelines for the functions of the executives, their associated councils, the Gymkhana Festivals and other matters pertaining to the Student body at large.

The Students' Senate has a say in the policy and decision-making bodies of the institute. The president, Students' Gymkhana and the chairperson, Students' Senate are among the special invitees to the Institute Academic Senate. The president is usually invited to the meetings of the board of governors when matters affecting students are being discussed. Nominees of the Students' Senate are also members of the various standing Committees of the Institute Senate including the disciplinary committee, the Undergraduate and Postgraduate committee, etc. All academic departments have Departmental Undergraduate and Post Graduate Committees consisting of members of the faculty and student nominees.

Notable alumni

See also
Indian Institutes of Technology
National Institutes of Technology
Institutes of National Importance

References

External links

 

 
Kanpur
Engineering colleges in Uttar Pradesh
Universities and colleges in Kanpur
Educational institutions established in 1959
1959 establishments in Uttar Pradesh